David Ellicott Evans (March 19, 1788 – May 17, 1850) briefly served as a United States representative from New York in 1827.

Biography 
Evans was born in Ellicotts Upper Mills, Maryland.  He attended the common schools, moved to New York in 1803 and settled in Batavia.  He was employed as a clerk and afterward as an accounting clerk with the Holland Land Company.

Political career 
He served as a member of the New York State Senate, and was a member of the council of appointment.

Evans was elected as a Jacksonian candidate to the Twentieth Congress and served from March 4, 1827, until his resignation May 2, 1827, before the assembling of Congress.

Later career and death 
He was appointed resident agent of the Holland Land Company in 1827 and served until his resignation in 1837.  Evans also engaged in banking, was a delegate to the convention held at Albany in 1827 to advocate a protective tariff, and retired from active business pursuits in 1837 to devote his attention to his extensive land interests.

He died in Batavia and was interred in Batavia Cemetery.

References
 
 

1788 births
1850 deaths
New York (state) state senators
People from Ellicott City, Maryland
People from Batavia, New York
Jacksonian members of the United States House of Representatives from New York (state)
19th-century American politicians
Members of the United States House of Representatives from New York (state)